Nakajima USA, Inc., is an American toy manufacturer, founded in 2000. It is a wholly owned subsidiary of Nakajima Japan, a family run company founded in 1919. A seasoned company in the design and manufacture of licensed plush, collectible and seasonal toys and gifts, Nakajima USA currently produces and distributes a wide range of lifestyle products under a master license agreement for Sanrio Inc. as well as the company’s signature characters.

Nakajima USA has produced and distributed lifestyle products for brands including Angry Little Girls, Harajuku Lovers and Sesame Street. Nakajima USA operates in Los Angeles and San Francisco. The stores division, sales, marketing, finance and operations are based in Los Angeles, while warehouse facilities, customer service, credit and merchandise control and based in San Francisco.

History

Nakajima Corporation 
 Founded in 1919
 CEO: Shinji Nakajima
 Employees: 75 in Japan; 360 in the United States
 Related Company: Partner Corporation, Nakajima USA, Inc.

1919: Founder and CEO Koichi Nakajima started celluloid Toy Plush in Kameido, Koto-ku in Japan

1945: Office moved from Kameido, Koto-ku to Chuo, Edogawa-ku where it is currently located

1953: Company organization changed to corporation

1953: Start producing inflatable vinyl toys

1959: Trade name changed to Nakajima Seisakusho.

1962: License contract with Walt Disney Company, produced floating ring, floating boat, and kids pool

1986: New head office building at 1-7-8 Chuo Edogawa-ku established

1988: Founds partner corporation Nakajima USA. Begins license contract with Sanrio.

1991: Trade name changed to Nakajima Corporation

1996: New organization with the new CEO Shinji Nakajima begins

Nakajima USA 
In April 2004, Sanrio Co. Ltd., expanded its license to Nakajima USA to include all categories of products for US Sanrio Boutique Stores and specialty gift retailers.

Nakajima USA currently assumes responsibility for the US boutique and retail stores business to include 49 independently run Sanrio stores, 47 Nakajima USA corporate-owned Sanrio stores, and the wholesale gift business to include 2000+ accounts nationwide. Today, Nakajima USA is Sanrio’s principle licensee and its primary partner for the Specialty Retail Channel in the US.

Sanrio, best known for icon Hello Kitty and home to many more characters including Chococat, My Melody, and Keroppi, celebrated its 50th anniversary in August 2010. Today, over 50,000 Sanrio-branded items are sold in over 70 countries around the world. In the Western Hemisphere Sanrio character-branded products are sold in upwards of 12,000 locations including department, specialty, national chain stores and over Sanrio Boutique stores.

In 2020, Nakajima Japan head office was moved back to Kameido.

Prominent Sanrio characters
 Badtz-Maru
 Charmmy Kitty
 Chococat
 Cinnamoroll
 Hello Kitty
 Keroppi
 Kuromi
 Little Twin Stars
 My Melody
 Sugarbunnies

Nakajima original characters
 Pickles the Frog
 Baby Coco
 Buta: Coron
 Zou: Coron

Sanrio stores
Typically  and in major metropolitan malls, Nakajima oversees 2 kinds of Sanrio Boutique stores. Corporate stores are owned and managed directly by the company while licensed stores are owned and operated by individual store owners in the region.

Flagship stores
Flagship stores are Sanrio Boutique stores over  that offer a wide selection of Sanrio merchandise, including limited-edition and collector items, specialty products from Japan, “Sanrio Luxe” branded high-end items, and select licensed merchandise often not found in other Sanrio Boutiques. Nakajima-operated flagship stores can be found in New York City, NY, Ala Moana, HI, San Francisco, CA, Las Vegas, NV, Costa Mesa, CA, Orlando, FL,  Chicago, IL, Garden State, NJ, and Houston, TX.

Merchandise/products
Each Sanrio Boutique store offers a wide range of products featuring Sanrio characters including stationery, clothing, cosmetics, accessories, home furnishing, toys and candy. New products are released every month. Nakajima USA also offers its own signature characters, with a fun line of ultra-soft plush and other popular product categories.

Future expansion
With the continued success of the licensed store concept, Sanrio-Nakajima hopes to focus on actively expanding its retail store operations and plans to do so primarily through the licensed store concept. Building on its numerous successful store operations in California and the west coast, Nakajima plans to bring the Sanrio Boutique store retail concept to states in the mid-west and the east coast in the very near future.

References

External links
Sanrio's Official English website
http://www.franchise.com/business-opportunity/retail-store/candy/San-Rio/company-information.cfm
http://www.hoovers.com/company/Nakajima_Usa_Inc/rythrti-1.html
Nakajima Japan's official website
Sanrio Japan's official website
https://www.facebook.com/home.php?#!/sanrioluxe?ref=ts
https://www.facebook.com/home.php?#!/hellokitty?ref=ts

Toy companies of the United States
Sanrio
American subsidiaries of foreign companies